The Chief of Georgian Defense Forces is a chief of defence and commander of the Defense Forces of Georgia, under the authority of the Government of Georgia.

History 
The position was (re)introduced in accordance with the Georgian Law on Defense of 31 October 2018. It had its precursor —the Commander-in-Chief of the Army— in the Democratic Republic of Georgia from 1918 to 1921. From the 1990s until 2018 the Chief of the General Staff was the highest-ranking military officer in the Georgian military, chief military adviser to the President, and wartime commander of the Armed Forces of Georgia.

The first holder of the position was Lieutenant General Vladimer Chachibaia. The incumbent is Major General Giorgi Matiashvili.

Functions and responsibilities 
The Chief of Georgian Defense Forces is a chief military officer in the Georgian Defense Forces (GDF). They oversee the coherence of the armed forces organization, combat readiness and mobilization as well as military development of the GDF, and are responsible for conduct of operations in war, including plans of use, general articulation of forces, and distribution of operational means between various groups of forces. The Chief of Georgian Defense Forces is aided, in their functions, by the General Staff of the Georgian Defense Forces. One of the Chief's deputies can, simultaneously, serve as the Chief of the General Staff. 

The Chief of Georgian Defense Forces is appointed and dismissed by the President of Georgia (on the advice of the Prime Minister) after the candidacy has been nominated by the Minister of Defense and submitted to the Presidency by the Government of Georgia. The nominee must have the highest military rank and high military education. The Chief reports to the Minister of Defense, the Prime Minister, and the President.

List

Commanders-in-Chief of the Democratic Republic of Georgia (1918–1921)

Chiefs of Georgian Defense Forces (Since 2018)

References 

Chiefs of defence
Military of Georgia (country)
2018 establishments in Georgia (country)